Herbert Kastinger (July 1, 1900 – August 5, 1937) was an Austrian architect. In 1936 he won a bronze medal together with Hermann Stiegholzer in the art competitions of the Olympic Games for their "Kampfstätte in Wien" ("Sporting Centre in Vienna").

References

External links
 profile

1900 births
1937 deaths
Olympic bronze medalists in art competitions
20th-century Austrian architects
Medalists at the 1936 Summer Olympics
Olympic competitors in art competitions